Edward Louis Masry (July 29, 1932 – December 5, 2005) was an American lawyer, a partner in the law firm of Masry & Vititoe and also a mayor and city councilman for the City of Thousand Oaks, California. With the help of his legal assistant Erin Brockovich, Masry built a case against the Pacific Gas & Electric Company (PG&E) of California in 1993. Their successful lawsuit was the subject of the Oscar-winning film, Erin Brockovich (2000), starring Julia Roberts as Brockovich and Albert Finney as Masry.

Early life
Masry was born in Paterson, New Jersey, to Syrian immigrant parents who ran a silk apparel business. He moved west to Southern California with his family when he was age eight, settling first in Venice and later in Van Nuys.

Education
As an undergraduate, Masry attended L.A. Valley Junior College, University of California, Santa Barbara, University of California Los Angeles, and University of Southern California, and served with the U.S. Army in France from 1952 to 1954 during the Korean War era, attaining the rank of corporal. Although he never received a Bachelor's degree, Loyola Law School in Los Angeles accepted him on an exemption due to high placement test scores, and he graduated with a Juris Doctor degree in 1960. Thereafter, he was admitted to the State Bar of California, and set up private practice in 1961.

Career
Masry's law firm was instrumental in bringing about the multi-plaintiff direct action suit against Pacific Gas & Electric Company, alleging contamination of drinking water with hexavalent chromium in the Southern California town of Hinkley. The case was settled in 1996 for $333 million, the largest settlement ever paid in a direct-action lawsuit in American history.

The case was adapted for the successful 2000 film Erin Brockovich, with Albert Finney portraying Masry. He had a non-speaking cameo appearance in the film as a restaurant patron sitting behind Julia Roberts, as did Erin Brockovich, who played a waitress.

Personal life
Masry died at age 73 at Los Robles Hospital in Thousand Oaks, due to complications related to diabetes. He had resigned from the City Council of Thousand Oaks one week earlier because of his medical condition.

Filmography

References

External links 

1932 births
2005 deaths
20th-century American lawyers
20th-century American politicians
American politicians of Syrian descent
Burials at Valley Oaks Memorial Park
California city council members
California lawyers
Deaths from diabetes
Loyola Law School alumni
People from Thousand Oaks, California
Politicians from Paterson, New Jersey
Trial lawyers
United States Army non-commissioned officers
University of California, Los Angeles alumni
University of California, Santa Barbara alumni
University of Southern California alumni